Srikanthalakshmi Arulanandam, in Tamil: சிறீகாந்தலட்சுமி அருளானந்தம் (1961 – December 25, 2019) was a Sri Lankan librarian and writer, who was an advocate for feminism, media literacy and Eelam-Tamil bibliography. 

Born in Inuvil, the eldest of seven children, she studied at Sunnagam Ramanathan College and graduated with a degree in Economics from Jaffna University. She then pursued a degree in Information Science and Documentation from Kamarasar University, Madurai. Her career as a librarian began in 1989 as Assistant Librarian at Jaffna University and by 2012 was appointed Principle Librarian. She was elected President of the Sri Lanka Library Association in 2017 and was also President of the National Library and Information Science of Sri Lanka. She also published several books with Vanathi Publishing House. She died of a heart attack on 25 December 2019 in Inuvil.

References 

2019 deaths
1961 births
University of Jaffna
Sri Lankan women academics
Women librarians